Divine Revolution is the first studio album by Russian metal band Dominia.

Track listing

Personnel
 Anton Rosa − vocals
 Casper – violin, keyboards
 Kat − violin
 Daniel – guitar
 Papa − drums
 Alexander Goodwin – bass

Sources 
 Review by Rock Hard 

2006 debut albums